Hajjiabad (also Romanized as Ḩājjīābād) is a village in Machian Rural District, Kelachay District, Rudsar County, Gilan Province, Iran. At the 2006 census, its population was 186, in 54 families.

References 

Populated places in Rudsar County